David Houghton may refer to:

 David Houghton (cricketer) (born 1957), Zimbabwean Test cricketer
 David Houghton (designer), English graphic artist, designer and photographer
 David Houghton (footballer), New Zealand international football (soccer) player
 David P. Houghton (born 1966), British political scientist
 Dave Houghton, British drummer for the Joe Jackson Band